The 9th annual Nickelodeon Australian Kids' Choice Awards was held on Friday 7 October 2011 at the Sydney Entertainment Centre. The show was hosted by Jennette McCurdy and Nathan Kress, known for starring in the hit Nickelodeon teen sitcom iCarly. It was the final installment of the Kids' Choice Awards in Australia before replaced by Nickelodeon Slimefest in 2012.

Winners and nominees

People

Music

Fresh Aussie Musos

Fave Aussie Musos
 Jessica Mauboy
 Cody Simpson Winner
 Justice Crew
 Jack Vidgen

Fave International Artist
 Lady GaGa
 Willow Smith
 Bruno Mars
 ''Katy Perry WinnerFave Song Party Rock Anthem – LMFAO Winner Price Tag – Jessie J
 Loud – Stan Walker
 Whip My Hair – Willow Smith

TVFave TV Show Big Time Rush
 iCarly
 Wizards of Waverly PlaceWinner Victorious
 Home and AwayFave TV Star Miranda Cosgrove
 Selena Gomez Winner Victoria JusticeFave Reality ShowTop Toon SpongeBob SquarePants Winner Phineas and Ferb
 The Simpsons
 The Penguins of Madagascar

PeopleThe LOL Award Luke and Wyatt
 Hamish and Andy
 Jennette McCurdy Winner Josh ThomasCutest CoupleHottest Hottie Samantha Harris
 Samara Weaving
 Victoria Justice Winner Lara BingleHottest Guy Hotties Justin Bieber Winner Taylor Lautner
 David Jones-Roberts
 Big Time RushAwesome Aussie Chris Hemsworth
 Rove
 Jennifer Hawkins
 Cody Simpson WinnerPlatinum Achievement AwardBig Kid AwardMoviesFave Movie Cars 2
 Harry Potter and the Deathly Hallows – Part 2'' Winner
 Rango
 Kung Fu Panda 2

Favourite Movie Star

Fave Kiss

References

External links
Official website

Nickelodeon Kids' Choice Awards
2011 awards
2011 in Australian television
2010s in Sydney